Hagemeyer is a business-to-business (B2B) distribution services group focusing on the markets for electrical materials, safety and other maintenance, repair and operations (MRO) products in Europe, North America and Asia-Pacific. It was based in the Netherlands and acquired by French rival Rexel in 2008, with its units in certain countries subsequently being divested to Sonepar. Following the purchase, the Hagemeyer brand disappeared in some countries but remained in others.

History
In January 2004, Hagemeyer sold Elektro Fröschl electronic, its wholesale division, to Media-Saturn, thus reinforcing its focus on retail.

On 23 November 2007, the board of Hagemeyer agreed to a €3.1 billion takeover offer from larger French rival Rexel. Upon completion of the bid, some of Hagemeyer's units were then sold on to Sonepar, a privately held French company in the same sector. Sonepar had previously had its own lower bid for Hagemeyer rejected. Hagemeyer was removed from the AEX index on 7 March 2008 as Rexel declared its offer unconditional. Delisting of the firm's shares from the Amsterdam Stock Exchange took place on 21 April.

In 2010, Hagemeyer North America gets accredited to distribute its products to the aerospace industry.

Acquisition and split
Following the 2007 acquisition by Rexel, the international branches of Hagemeyer became :

Controlled by Rexel
Australia: No change
Belgium: Breva
Czech Republic: No change
Estonia: Elektroskandia
Finland: Elektroskandia
Germany: Rexel
Latvia: Elektroskandia
Lithuania: Elektroskandia
Norway: Elektroskandia
Poland: Elektroskandia
Russia: Elektroskandia
Spain: Rexel
Netherlands: Hagemeyer
United Kingdom: Rexel

Controlled by Sonepar
Australia: No change
Austria: No change
Canada: Century Vallen
China: Hagemeyer and Elektroskandia
Mexico: No change
Sweden: Elektroskandia
Switzerland: Winterhalter Fenner
United States: No Change

Activity
More than 90% of Hagemeyer's total revenue was generated by its core Professional Products and Services (PPS) business, which focused on the value-added business-to-business distribution of electrical parts and supplies, safety goods (such as hard hats and work boots) and other MRO products in some 25 countries across Europe, North America and Asia-Pacific. The remaining part of Hagemeyer's revenues was realised by its Agencies/Consumer Electronics (ACE) business, which distributes consumer electronics and branded products in the Netherlands and Australia and luxury goods in a number of countries in Asia.

In Australia, Hagemeyer was the principal distributor and marketer of home appliance and lifestyle brands such as Omega, Blanco, & De Dietrich cooking appliances along with Omega Altise seasonal products. Shriro Australia acquired Hagemeyer Brands Australia in 2011.

References

External links
 (link to the individual units now owned by Rexel and Sonepar)

Business services companies established in 1900
Defunct companies of the Netherlands
Distributors
Gooise Meren